Tsata is a form of jewelry in the shape of a turned over crescent, typically made from gold or silver. It is placed at the bottom of a riza as a part of the icon decoration in the Eastern Orthodox Church. Tsata looks like a neck ring. It is specifically attached to the riza so that it is placed under the face of a saint, and it typically fastened by its edges to the inner bottom edge of a venets (a halo or a crown above the saint's head). 

Tsatas could contain a pattern (imprinted, stamped, filigree), gemstones and other design elements. 
They were a part of most Holy Trinity, Jesus, Virgin Mary icons. They were also used for the icons of some most highly venerated saints of the Orthodox Church, such as John the Baptist, Saint Nicholas, Sergius of Radonezh. The crescent has always been an important symbol for the Eastern Orthodox Church, and tsata itself symbolized a high rank of the saint in the Kingdom of God. Tsata is also a part of the Orthodox cross (placed at the bottom).

See also 
 Torc

References

External links
 .

Decorative arts
Eastern Orthodox icons
Christian iconography